S. K. Misro (born January 1945), popularly known as Misro, is an Indian actor known for his works exclusively Telugu cinema, Telugu theatre and Television.  He is one of the pioneers of modern Telugu social theatre, and has received six state Nandi Awards. He is best known for his association with director K. Viswanath.

Theatre
Pavala
Veta Kukkalu
Kala Dharmam
Kedi

Filmography

Needaleni Aadadi (1973)
Ainavallu (1975)
Maainti Devudu (1975)
Mangalyaniki Maromudi (1976)
Andarikante Monagadu (1977)
Abhimanyudu (1976)
Maro Charitra (1976)
Punar Milan ( 1976 ) - Oriya
Lakshmi (1978)
Andamaina Anubhavam(1979)
Srivariki Premalekha
Ek Duuje Ke Liye (1981)
Shubh Kaamna (1983)
Saagara Sangamam (1983)
Prema enta Madhuram
O Prema Kadha
Premayanam
Siri vennela (1986)
Srutilayalu (1987)
Swayamkrushi (1987)
Sirimuvvala Simhanadam
Priyatama
Shravanthi
Sahasam
Kayyalammai Kalavarabbai
Swarna Kamalam (1988)
Swathi Kiranam (1992)
Donga Kollu
Repati Rowdy
Gangwar
Sundarakanda
Ee Svatantram Ennallu
Prema Pustakam (1993) 
Subha Sankalpam (1995)
ManasaVeena
Ido Prema Charitra
Gulabi Mullu
Chinabbai
Pratibimbalu
Mechanic Mavayya
Ninne Ishtapaddanu
Toli Chupulone
Gopi Gopika Godavari
Ninne Istapaddanu

Television

DD Detective Subbarao vuruf D'Souza
Malladi Ramakrishna Sastri Kadhalu
Bharago Kadhalu
Idi Jivitham
Wonderboy
Kalankita
Lady Detective
Antarangalu
Sneha(Aatma Kadhalu)
Ee Taram Kadha
Anubandham
ETV's Sri Bhagavatam (as Sakuni)
Sankellu
Mr. Millenium
Anuhya
Jillellamudi Amma
Pelli chesukundam
Sarva Mangala
Bhagavata Kadhalu
Sri Krishna Balarama Yuddham
Usha Parinayam
Anuragalu
Bharatamlo chinna kadhalu
Bhaama Satyabhaama
Karna
Zee Telugu's Tholi Prema

References

External links

1945 births
Indian male film actors
Living people
Andhra University alumni
Nandi Award winners
Indian male stage actors
Indian male television actors
20th-century Indian male actors
Place of birth missing (living people)
Male actors in Telugu cinema
Male actors in Hindi television
Male actors in Malayalam cinema
21st-century Indian male actors